Variation and Evolution in Plants is a book written by G. Ledyard Stebbins, published in 1950. It is one of the key publications embodying the modern synthesis of evolution and genetics, as the first comprehensive publication to discuss the relationship between genetics and natural selection in plants. The book has been described by plant systematist Peter H. Raven as "the most important book on plant evolution of the 20th century" and it remains one of the most cited texts on plant evolution.

Origin

The book is based on the Jesup Lectures that Stebbins delivered at Columbia University in October and November 1946 and is a synthesis of his ideas and the then current research on the evolution of seed plants in terms of genetics.

Contents

The book is written in fourteen parts:
Description and analysis of variation patterns 
Examples of variation patterns within species and genera 
The basis of individual variation 
Natural selection and variation in populations 
Genetic systems as factors in evolution 
Isolation and the origin of species
Hybridization and its effects 
Polyploidy I: occurrence and nature of polyploid types
Polyploidy II: geographic distribution and significance of polyploidy
Apomixis in relation to variation and evolution
Structural hybridity and the genetic system
Evolutionary trends I: the karyotype
Evolutionary trends II: External morphology
Fossils, modern distribution patterns and rates of evolution

Significance

The 643-page book cites more than 1,250 references and was the longest of the four books associated with the modern evolutionary synthesis. The other key works of the modern synthesis, whose publication also followed their authors' Jesup lectures, are Theodosius Dobzhansky's Genetics and the Origin of Species, Ernst Mayr's Systematics and the Origin of Species and George Gaylord Simpson's Tempo and Mode in Evolution. The great significance of Variation and Evolution in Plants is that it effectively killed any serious belief in alternative mechanisms of evolution for plants, such as Lamarckian evolution or soft inheritance, which were still upheld by
some botanists.

Legacy

Stebbins book Flowering Plants: Evolution Above the Species Level was published in 1974 and was based on the Prather Lectures which he gave at Harvard. It is considered as an update to Variation and Evolution.

In January 2000 a colloquium was held in Irvine, California, to celebrate the fiftieth anniversary of the publication of Variation and Evolution in Plants. A  16 chapter book entitled Variation and evolution in Plants and Microorganisms: Toward a New Synthesis 50 Years After Stebbins was released to mark the occasion.

References
Raven, P. 1974. "Plant systematics 1947-1972." Annals of the Missouri Botanical Garden 61:166-178
Smocovitis, V. B. and Ayala, F. J. 2000. George Ledyard Stebbins. Biographical Memoirs of the National Academy of Sciences 85:290-313
Raven, P. H. 2000. "G. Ledyard Stebbins (1906–2000): An appreciation". Proceedings of the National Academy of Sciences 97:6945-6946

1950 non-fiction books
Books about evolution
Botany books
Columbia University Press books
Modern synthesis (20th century)